Paidia atargatis is a moth of the family Erebidae. It was described by Stefan Lewandowski and Kerstin Tober in 2009. It is found in Jordan.

References

Nudariina
Moths described in 2009